Frozen Justice is a 1929 American pre-Code drama film directed by Allan Dwan. The picture starred Lenore Ulric in her first sound film and is based on the 1920 novel, Norden For Lov og Ret, by Ejnar Mikkelsen. A shorter, silent version of the film was also released. The film was set in Nome, Alaska during the Klondike Gold Rush in 1898 and 1899.

Both versions are now presumed lost. One reel of the film still exists and is preserved at the Library of Congress.

Cast
Lenore Ulric as Talu
Robert Frazer as Lanak
Louis Wolheim as Duke
Ullrich Haupt as Captain Jones
Laska Winter as Doulgamana
El Brendel as 'Swede'
Tom Patricola as 'Dancer'
Alice Lake as 'Little Casino'
Gertrude Astor as 'Moosehide' Kate
Adele Windsor as Boston School ma'am
Neyneen Farrell as 'Yukon' Lucy
Warren Hymer as The Bartender
Lou Morrison as The Proprietor
Charles Judels as The French Sailor
Joe Rochay as The Jewish Character
Meyers Sisters as The Harmony Duo
George MacFarlane as The Singer
Landers Stevens as Mate Moore
James Spencer as The Medicine Man
Arthur Stone as 'French' Pete
Jack Ackroyd as 'English' Eddie
Gertrude Chorre as Talu's Mother

Reception
The film received mixed reviews from critics. While critics praised the scenery and atmosphere, most felt the story was weak. The critic for the New York Herald Tribune felt the story was "chiefly deficient" while Variety called the film "moderately good".

The film premiered at the Roxy Theatre in New York City on October 25, 1929. The film's star, Lenore Ulric, and director Allan Dwan made a personal appearance at the premiere. Four days later, the stock market crashed which affected audience turnout as celebratory films about the gold rush were less of a draw.

References

External links

 
 Lobby poster #1 
 Lobby poster #2

1929 films
1929 drama films
Fox Film films
American drama films
American silent feature films
American black-and-white films
Films based on Danish novels
Films directed by Allan Dwan
Films set in 1898
Films set in 1899
Films set in Alaska
Lost American films
Transitional sound films
Films with screenplays by Sonya Levien
1920s American films
Silent American drama films